Dennis Östlundh (born 30 August 1977) is a former Swedish footballer who last played for Jönköpings Södra IF in the Superettan.

A native of Stockholm, Dennis Östlundh, who is 184 cm. (just under 6 ft. 1 in.), holds the position of center midfielder.

References

External links 
 

Swedish footballers
AIK Fotboll players
GIF Sundsvall players
Footballers from Stockholm
1977 births
Living people
Allsvenskan players
Superettan players
Väsby IK players
Jönköpings Södra IF players
Association football midfielders